Elizabeth Zamora Gordillo (born May 11, 1993 in Guatemala City) is a Guatemalan taekwondo practitioner. At the 2012 Summer Olympics, she competed in the Women's 49kg competition, but was defeated by Thai opponent Chanatip Sonkham in the bronze medal Repechage match.

References

External links
 

Guatemalan female taekwondo practitioners
1993 births
Living people
Olympic taekwondo practitioners of Guatemala
Taekwondo practitioners at the 2012 Summer Olympics
Taekwondo practitioners at the 2015 Pan American Games

Central American and Caribbean Games gold medalists for Guatemala
Central American and Caribbean Games bronze medalists for Guatemala
Competitors at the 2010 Central American and Caribbean Games
Competitors at the 2014 Central American and Caribbean Games
Central American and Caribbean Games medalists in taekwondo
Pan American Games competitors for Guatemala
21st-century Guatemalan women